Kwenukweltimarogai is a village in Jigonikme district, Puncak Jaya Regency in Central Papua province, Indonesia. Its population is 503.

Climate
Kwenukweltimarogai has a wet alpine tundra climate (ET) with heavy rainfall year-round.

References

Villages in Central Papua